VWFC may refer to:

Von Willebrand factor type C domain, a protein domain and family
Very Wide Field Camera, space camera developed by NASA for Spacelab 1 and Spacelab 3
Vancouver Whitecaps FC, a Canadian professional soccer team